Convoy PQ 7 was the eighth of the Arctic convoys of the Second World War by which the Western Allies supplied material aid to the Soviet Union in its fight with Nazi Germany. The convoy was in two parts: PQ 7a sailed from Hvalfjörður, Iceland on 26 December 1941 and arrived at Murmansk on 12 January 1942. PQ 7b sailed from Hvalfjord, Iceland on 31 December 1941 and arrived in Murmansk on 11 January 1942.

Ships

PQ 7a
PQ 7a consisted of two merchant ships; SS Cold Harbor (Panama) and SS Waziristan (UK), and was escorted by two armed trawlers. SS Waziristan was sunk by the German submarine  on 2 January 1942.

Complete list of ships of PQ 7a

PQ 7b
PQ 7b comprised nine merchant vessels (two Panamanian, one Russian and seven British). The escort consisted of the destroyers ,  and two armed trawlers.

All ships arrived safely.

Ships in Convoy PQ 7b

Footnotes

References

 
 

PQ 07
C